Som is a village in Sandila block of Hardoi district, Uttar Pradesh, India. It was previously counted as a census town, but the 2011 census reclassified it as a village. It is connected to state highways and has 3 primary schools and 0 healthcare facilities. As of 2011, its population is 5,040, in 1,135 households.

References

Cities and towns in Hardoi district